Dunvant Rugby Football Club are a Welsh rugby union club based in Dunvant, Swansea in South Wales. Dunvant RFC is a member of the Welsh Rugby Union. They competed in the Welsh Championship for   the first time in  2016/2017, but were relegated back to the WRU Division One West the same season.

Club honours
[WWRU Section D] 1983/04 - Champions
[WWRU Section C] 1985/06 - Champions
[WWRU Section A] 1989/90 - Champions
[WRU Division Two] 1990/91 - Champions
[WRU Division Two] 1992/93 - Champions
[WRU Division Two] 1995/96 - Champions
[WRU Division One] 1998/99 - Champions
[WRU Division Two West] 2005/06 - Champions
[WRU Division One West] 2015/16 - Champions

Notable past players
  David John Thomas (10 caps)
  Richie Rees (9 caps)
  Andy Williams (5 caps)
  Mefin Davies (39 caps)

Games played against international opposition

References

External links
 Dunvant Rugby Club

Welsh rugby union teams
Rugby union in Swansea